Gunn Charoenkul (born 10 April 1992) is a Thai professional golfer who plays on both the Asian Tour and Japan Golf Tour.

Professional career
Gunn was born in Bangkok, Thailand and turned professional in 2011. He won three tournaments on the All Thailand Golf Tour and played on the Asian Tour 2012–2014, where his best finish was T6 at the 2013 Solaire Open at the Wack Wack Golf and Country Club in the Philippines. 

He played on the PGA Tour China 2015–2016, where he won two tournaments, the 2014 Yunnan Open and the 2016 Chongqing Jiangnan NewTown KingRun Open. 

Back on the Asian Tour, he was runner-up at the 2016 Queen's Cup in his native Thailand and the 2019 BNI Indonesian Masters, and third at the 2020 Hong Kong Open behind Wade Ormsby and Shane Lowry.

In 2018, he joined the Japan Golf Tour, where he posted 10 top-10s in 2019. He qualified for the 2019 Open Championship by finishing T3 at the Mizuno Open, but missed the cut.

In early 2020, he reached a career high of 126th on the Official World Golf Ranking, and in 2021 he qualified for the 2020 Summer Olympics in Tokyo together with Jazz Janewattananond.

Professional wins (12)

China Tour wins (3)

All Thailand Golf Tour wins (4)

1Co-sanctioned by the ASEAN PGA Tour

ASEAN PGA Tour wins (5)

1Co-sanctioned by the All Thailand Golf Tour
2Co-sanctioned by the Professional Golf of Malaysia Tour

Philippine Golf Tour wins (1)

Thailand PGA Tour wins (2)

Results in major championships

CUT = missed the halfway cut

References

External links

Gunn Charoenkul
Asian Tour golfers
Gunn Charoenkul
Golfers at the 2020 Summer Olympics
Gunn Charoenkul
1992 births
Living people